Andre or André is the French form of the given name Andrew.

Andre or André may also refer to:

People
 Andre (surname)
 André (artist) (born 1971), Swedish-Portuguese graffiti artist
 André (singer), Armenian singer
 André the Giant, actor and wrestler

Fictional people
André, character in 1984 film The Adventures of André and Wally B.
André Harris, a character from the Nickelodeon TV series Victorious

Places
 Andre, Estonia, a village in Põlva Parish, Põlva County Estonia
 André, CAR, a village in the Central African Republic near Abiras
 André, Ouest, a rural settlement in Haiti

Music

 André (band), rock band from Quebec, Canada

Films and plays
 Andre (film), 1994 film adaptation of the book A Seal Called Andre
 André (play), William Dunlap play

Other uses
 André (car), British sports car
 André (wine), brand of sparkling wine
 André, an 1834 novel by George Sand

See also
 Andrew